The J. G. Whitfield Estate is a historic site in Sarasota, Florida. It is located at 2704 Bayshore Drive. On September 12, 1985, it was added to the U.S. National Register of Historic Places.

References and external links

 Sarasota County listings at National Register of Historic Places
 Sarasota County listings at Florida's Office of Cultural and Historical Programs

Houses on the National Register of Historic Places in Sarasota County, Florida
Houses in Sarasota, Florida
Houses completed in 1925
Mediterranean Revival architecture in Florida
1925 establishments in Florida